The tenth season of the singing competition O Ses Türkiye (English: The Voice Turkey) premiered on 2 October 2021, at TV8 and broadcasts at 20:00 every Saturday.

Murat Boz and Beyazıt Öztürk are the returning coaches from season nine, being joined by former O Ses Çocuklar (kids' version) coach Oğuzhan Koç, and Ebru Gündeş who last coached in season five. Acun Ilıcalı remained as presenter since the inaugural season of the program.

Teams 

  Winner
  Runner-up
  Third place
  Fourth place
  Eliminated in the Semifinals
  Eliminated in the Knockouts
  Stolen in the Battles
  Eliminated in the Battles

Blind auditions 
Blind auditions premiered on October 2. The "block" button returned for its second season. Coaches can use the block button as much as they like and they can use it even the performance is already done by the contestant. Also, three blocks are permitted to use during the contestant's audition.

Notes

References 

Turkey
2021 television seasons